Joyland Amusement Park was an amusement park in Wichita, Kansas, United States. It was in continuous operation for 55 years, from June 12, 1949 to 2004, closing permanently in 2006. It was once the largest theme park in central Kansas and featured a wooden roller coaster and 15 other rides.

History

20th century
The park was founded by Lester Ottaway and his sons Herbert and Harold to house a miniature  gauge steam locomotive that Herbert had purchased in Fort Scott in 1933. The train had been part of a defunct amusement park there and was originally built by the Miniature Railway Company of Elgin, Illinois, between 1905 and 1910. By 1934, Herbert, who worked as a race car builder, had fully refurbished and restored the steam locomotive and cars and began transporting the miniature train to county fairs in western Kansas and eastern Colorado. He soon built a track for his miniature locomotive around the Manitou Springs, Colorado, racetrack and operated the train there for some time.

The park was founded on June 12, 1949, primarily to give Harold's miniature locomotive a permanent home in Kansas. It was originally at 1515 East Central in Wichita (between New York and Mathewson streets) but soon moved to its final location at 2801 South Hillside. After Lester Ottaway’s death in the mid-1950s, his three sons, Herbert, Harold and Eddie, continued running it as a family operation.

The Ottaway brothers retired from the amusement park business in the early 1970s and sold the park to Stanley and Margaret Nelson. Stanley died on July 13, 2010, at the age of 87. He and Margaret led the park for over 30 years and a large percentage of its rides, including the Bill Tracy-designed prototype Whacky Shack dark ride, added in 1974, come from the Nelsons' time. Though there are a few Whacky Shacks still in use across the country, this classic two-story dark ride was the last known project of Tracy's, as he died in August 1974, just a few months after its completion. The original miniature train retired with the Ottaways and was replaced with the first-ever C. P. Huntington miniature train built by Chance Rides. It carries serial number 1 from the factory.

21st century
The Ferris wheel, manufactured by Eli Bridge Company and operating there since its 1949 opening, had an accident in mid-April 2004 in which a 13-year-old girl fell  from it and was seriously injured. The U.S. Consumer Product Safety Commission investigated the accident.

Due to economic troubles and safety concerns the park had to close for the 2004 season. Interest rose again in 2006 when a Seattle-based company, T-Rex Group, leased it to restore and open portions of it. After financial concerns, it did not open for another season. Since then, it stood empty and deteriorated. Since its closing in 2004, it has been subjected to vandalism and looting. Nearly every building is covered with graffiti, the vintage sign from the top of the roller coaster was stolen in 2009, and the administration offices have been destroyed. Park owner Margaret Nelson said, "We're sick. Our hearts are just sick. It's not easy, not easy."

In 2006, many renovations were focused on aesthetics rather than ride safety. The roller coaster had $10,000 worth of wood repairs and was renamed "The Nightmare". The Log Jam, the only water ride, had pumps replaced and systems checked, and the noticeable difference was the baby blue and pink paint. The Restore Hope organization got involved to regain support to rebuild it with an emphasis on a community effort and involvement in the restoration process. The plan was to restore it within the next few years and begin a five step expansion process to help it grow and become an integral part of the Wichita community.

In 2010, co-owner Stanley Nelson died.

On August 4, 2012, a maintenance building in the park caught fire. None of the rides were damaged and the fire was subdued in 30 minutes. Police suspected arson.

In May 2014, it was announced that Joyland owner Margaret Nelson Spear donated the carousel to the Botanica gardens in Wichita, and it will be fully restored.

In June 2014, the iconic parking lot sign and marquee was sold to the Historic Preservation Alliance of Wichita and Sedgwick County. It was dismantled, removed for local storage, and eventual restoration.

On February 19, 2015, the Wichita Police Department announced the return of Louie the Clown, the animatronic clown that had played the Wurlitzer organ. He had gone missing over a decade prior and was found in the home of Damian Mayes, a former park employee. In 2008, Wichita police received a tip that Mayes, who had maintained Louie and the organ, had Louie, but he denied knowing his whereabouts.

The roller coaster was extensively damaged by a windstorm on the morning of April 3, 2015, including the destruction of large portions of elevated track. In April, the owner's son Roger Nelson, told reporters, "We are in the process of tearing it all down", referring to the roller coaster and the remaining buildings on the site. He had announced the previous week that the Preservation Alliance had purchased several of the park's marquee attractions, including the Whacky Shack building and a horse and buggy ride, and was negotiating to purchase the full-size train caboose that was stationed at the west end of Frontier Town. On July 23, 2015, the components of the roller coaster which remained standing were demolished.

On August 8, 2018, the "Whacky Shack" dark ride, one of the few remaining intact structures in the park and once among its most popular rides, was destroyed by fire.

In early November 2018, the 57 acres formerly comprising the site were purchased at auction by an anonymous buyer for $198,000.

On December 11, 2021, another fire was reported at the Joyland site.

Rides

Summary
The park featured a go-cart track and 16 rides, including:
 Dodge'm – bumper cars
 Ferris wheel
 Giant Slide
 Log Jam – a log flume-style ride
 Miniature train
 Paratrooper
 Roller coaster
 Round Up – a circa 1960 Hrubetz High Speed Circular ride
 Scrambler
 Skycoaster
 Tilt-A-Whirl
 The Whacky Shack – dark ride
 Zumur – A Chance Rides Swing ride

Roller coaster
The park's 1949 era wooden roller coaster, built by Philadelphia Toboggan Company and designed by Herbert Paul Schmeck, was one of the last surviving original wooden coasters. It was one of 33 coasters remaining of the 44 designated as an American Coaster Enthusiasts Classic. Originally called simply "Roller Coaster" but for a time renamed "Nightmare", it had a  track span,  drop and  top speed. It was the only remaining coaster in North America using vintage rolling stock with fixed lap bars. The film King Kung Fu was filmed on location at several locations in the Wichita area, including here. It was extensively damaged in a windstorm in early April 2015 and permanently dismantled shortly thereafter.

Fairground organ
The park had a Mammoth Military Band Organ, also known as a Wurlitzer Style #160, which was the largest of Wurlitzer’s early models. It was built around 1905 by the DeKleist Musical Instrument Works and was sold by the Rudolph Wurlitzer Company. It contained 486 wood and brass pipes and used two perforated paper music rolls, producing the effect of a military brass band of 20 to 25 musicians. This particular model was designed primarily for the roller rink industry. In 1915, it was taken back to the Wurlitzer factory and modified into a Wurlitzer Style 165. It was sold to W.P. Brown of Coffeyville, who owned and operated the Silurian Springs Bath House, which also featured a roller rink, for which the organ provided music for several years. In the 1930s it went into storage; it was heavily water damaged, and some of its brass parts were later stripped off during World War II scrap metal drives. In 1948, Jess Gibbs of Parsons, purchased it and began the painstaking work of restoration. In 1950 he sold the restored instrument to the Ottaway family, who installed it in the park. They added Louie, an animatronic clown who sat before the keyboard and "played" it. Louie and the Mighty Wurlitzer had been a fixture there ever since, creating a sound that resonated through the entire park. It was one of only two mammoth model organs still in existence and, until the park closed, was the only one in public view. Its current whereabouts and conditions are unknown.

Carousel
The park also featured an original Allan Herschell Company designed carousel, which was built in 1949, and which still has all of the original horses. It was disassembled at the end of every season, a process which had been carefully performed for protection every year beginning in 1951. In May 2014, Joyland owner Margaret Nelson Spear donated it to the Botanica in Wichita, with plans for a full restoration.  After restoration, it was open to the public on November 28, 2019.

In media
Elements of the park have been captured on the cover of the Andy McKee album, Joyland. The artist was given the theme of an "abandoned amusement park" and used imagery from it specifically, as McKee is a native of Kansas.

Joyland: Reliving the Memories is a 2018 PBS Kansas documentary.

A rock band called Scepter made a song and video called "Joyland".

See also
 List of defunct amusement parks
 Wild West World
 Wonderland Park

References

External links

 
 Joyland historical news from Wichita Eagle newspaper, specialcollections.wichita.edu
Photos:
 Historic photos, Wichita Photo Archives
 Numerous photos, Abandoned Kansas
 Archive of former joylandwichita.org website

Amusement parks in Kansas
1949 establishments in Kansas
Buildings and structures in Wichita, Kansas
Defunct amusement parks in the United States
2006 disestablishments in Kansas
Amusement parks opened in 1949
Amusement parks closed in 2006
Demolished buildings and structures in Kansas